Harbardsbreen is the 10th largest glacier in mainland Norway. It is located on the south side of the Tverrådalskyrkja mountain in the Breheimen mountain range in the municipality of Luster in Vestland county, Norway.

The  glacier is inside Breheimen National Park, just northeast of the Spørteggbreen glacier.

See also
List of glaciers in Norway

References

Glaciers of Vestland
Luster, Norway